The 2012 North Carolina lieutenant gubernatorial election was held on November 6, 2012, concurrently with the other elections to the Council of State and the gubernatorial election. Primary elections were held May 8.  The offices of Governor and Lieutenant Governor are elected independently. The incumbent, Lt. Gov. Walter H. Dalton, announced on Jan. 26, 2012 that he would run for Governor.

In the general election, Republican Dan Forest won 50.08% of the vote, narrowly defeating Democrat Linda Coleman. The election result was in doubt for almost two weeks after Election Day, and was within the margin in which Coleman could ask for a recount, but she chose not to do so on Nov. 19.

When he took office in January 2013, Forest became the state's first Republican lieutenant governor since Jim Gardner left office two decades earlier.

Democratic primary

Candidates

Declared
Linda Coleman, former state representative, state personnel director
Eric L. Mansfield, state senator

Declined
Cal Cunningham, former state senator
Hampton Dellinger, attorney

Polling

Results

Republican primary

Candidates
Declared
Dale Folwell, state representative, former Winston-Salem School Board member, accountant and investment advisor
Dan Forest, architect, son of Congresswoman Sue Myrick
Tony Gurley, Wake County Commissioner, pharmacist, ex-race car driver
Grey Mills, state representative
Arthur Rich, businessman

Polling

Results

Under state law, if no candidate receives 40 percent of the vote in the primary, the second-place candidate can request a second primary (runoff). According to unofficial May 8 primary election results, Gurley came in second, and he announced that he would request such a runoff.

General election

Polling

Results

Footnotes

2012 North Carolina elections
2012 United States lieutenant gubernatorial elections
2012